Passage GAA is a Hurling Club with Club Grounds the East Waterford village of   Passage East with Players representing the Club from nearby areas of Dunmore East, Cheekpoint, Woodstown, Faithlegg, Ballymacaw and environs.  Passage came close a number of times to capturing the Senior Hurling County Title losing three Waterford Senior Hurling Finals during the 1990s. Eventually, the Club captured the  County Senior Hurling Title in 2013, 17 years since their last final, on a score line of Ballygunner 3-13 Passage 3-16, coming from 7 points down (with 7 minutes normal time remaining) to score 2-4 without reply.

Honours

Waterford Senior Hurling Championships: 1 
 2013  Runners-Up: 1993, 1994, 2016, 2020
Waterford Intermediate Hurling Championships: 2
 1988, 2007
 Waterford Junior Hurling Championships: 2
 1937, 1998
 Waterford Minor Hurling Championships: 1
 2014

All Stars
 Eoin Kelly - 2002, 2008
 Noel Connors 2010, 2015, 2017.

References

Gaelic games clubs in County Waterford
Hurling clubs in County Waterford
Gaelic football clubs in County Waterford